According to official estimates in India, 10,749 people were killed, 5,640 people were missing and thousands of people became homeless when a tsunami triggered by the 2004 Indian Ocean earthquake near the Indonesian island of Sumatra struck the southern coast on 26 December 2004. The earthquake registered 9.1–9.3 Mw and was the largest in five decades. It was followed by strong aftershocks on the Andaman and Nicobar Islands. The death toll of the earthquake was 1,500 people.

Affected states and regions

This disaster affected a total of fourteen regions. The Andaman and Nicobar Islands comprise 572 islands (land masses at low and high tide), of which 38 are inhabited by people from the mainland and indigenous tribes. The official death toll was 1,310, with about 5,600 missing. The unofficial death toll (including those missing and presumed dead) was estimated at 7,000. This ocean earthquake goes down in history as the deadliest of all time. It took the lives of over 230,000 victims throughout the fourteen regions and wounded more than double this number.
The Great Nicobar and Car Nicobar islands were the worst hit among all the islands because of their proximity to the quake and relatively flat terrain. Aftershocks rocked the area,
and one-fifth of the population of the Nicobar Islands was reported dead, injured or missing. Chowra Island lost two-thirds of its population of 1,500. Entire islands were submerged, and Trinket Island was divided in two. Communications were cut to the Nancowry group of islands, some of which were submerged.

On Car Nicobar, 111 Indian Air Force personnel and their family members were washed away when the tsunami severely damaged their air base. St. Thomas Cathedral (also known as the John Richardson church after John Richardson, a missionary and member of parliament) was washed away. The church, established in 1930 was one of the oldest and prominent churches in the region. A cricket stadium named after John Richardson and a statue dedicated to him were also washed away.

Most of the population of the Andaman Islands are people from the mainland, primarily West Bengal and Tamil Nadu. The natives of the Andaman and Nicobar Islands are endangered tribal groups, such as the Jarawa, Sentinelese, Shompen, Onge and the Great Andamanese. They are anthropologically-significant as some of the world's most primitive tribes. Most have maintained their lifestyle for centuries, and government policy is one of non-interference. Most of the native islanders reportedly survived the tsunami because they lived on higher ground or far from the coast. The Onge (with a 2001 census population of 96), Jarawa (240), Sentinelese (39) and Great Andamanese (43) were reached by survey teams. The Sentinelese, on an island reserve, are hostile to outsiders and shot arrows at helicopters sent to check on them. On the Nicobar Islands the Nicobarese, a tribe with a Southeast Asian heritage (2001 population 28,653), lost about 656 lives with 3,000 missing. Surveys were conducted on the Shompen (2001 census count of 398) located on Great Nicobar island.

The population was evacuated, and there were no casualties. Indira Point (6°45’10″N and 93°49’36″E), the southernmost point of the Great Nicobar Island and India itself, subsided  in the tsunami and its lighthouse was damaged.

Meteorological and seismic reports
The Indian Meteorological Department warned people in coastal areas to exercise caution due to rough seas and tsunami. The Indian government issued a tsunami alert across India's coastal areas, triggering a panic which required clarifications.

Ex gratia payments

See also
 Disaster management in India
 Disaster Management Act, 2005

References

External links

 Rediff.com
 BBC coverage (includes video footage)
 GlobalSecurity.org
 CRISP, Singapore
 Rediff photos, set 1 Photo set 2
 Times of India photos
 The Hindu photos
 BBC photos
 Tribune India photos
 National Oceanic & Atmospheric Administration (NOAA), U.S. Tsunami page

2004 in India
India
History of the Andaman and Nicobar Islands
History of Andhra Pradesh (1947–2014)
Disasters in Andhra Pradesh
History of Kerala (1947–present)
21st century in Puducherry
2000s in Tamil Nadu
Disasters in Tamil Nadu
2004 disasters in India